Sabine Lisicki won the first edition of this tournament, defeating Aravane Rezaï in the final 6–2, 6–1. Her win came with the loss of only 13 games in 5 matches and a maximum loss of 3 games in each match.

Seeds

Qualifying

Draw

Finals

Top half

Bottom half

References
Main Draw

Texas Tenis Open - Singles